The Outer-ring Jiangjin Yangtze River Bridge, was Jiangjin Guanyinyan Bridge during construction, is a cable-stayed bridge which crosses the Yangtze River in near Jiangjin, Chongqing, China.  Completed in 2009, it has a main span of  placing it among the longest cable-stayed spans in the world. The bridge carries six lanes of traffic between on the G93 Chengdu–Chongqing Ring Expressway and G5001 Chongqing Ring Expressway between the Jiangjin District south of the Yangtze River and the Jiulongpo District to the north.

See also
List of largest cable-stayed bridges
Yangtze River bridges and tunnels

External links
https://archive.today/20130221094424/http://english.cqnews.net/cqnews/200905/t20090521_3296046.htm

Bridges in Chongqing
Bridges over the Yangtze River
Cable-stayed bridges in China
Bridges completed in 2009